The Huntsman Marine Science Centre (acronym: HMSC; previously Huntsman Marine Laboratory) is located on Lower Campus Road in St. Andrews, New Brunswick, Canada. The centre is a membership-driven, nonprofit organization founded by a consortium of universities with the support of the National Research Council of Canada, Fisheries and Oceans Canada, and the New Brunswick Department of Fisheries and Aquaculture. Mr. Chris Bridger is the executive director; Dr. W.B. Scott is senior scientist emeritus. It is named in honor of Archibald Gowanlock Huntsman, director of the St. Andrews Biological Station that adjoins the centre, who stimulated fishery research in the region.

History
It was founded in 1969 by a consortium of universities in Eastern Canada, and several government departments, who pooled their resources in order to provide field research and teaching facilities that would complement their programs in marine biology and oceanography. The government assisted with the purchase of the Sir Thomas Tait Estate which included another 50 acres, and the large Anderson House, which provides accommodation for visiting students. A public aquarium opened in 1972. The name was changed to Huntsman Marine Science Centre in 1987. In 1991 and again in 1999, the HMSC was awarded the Gulf of Maine Visionary Award.

Geography

Services and facilities
HMSC has teaching and aquaculture research laboratories and a  research vessel. The HMSC hosts the executive office of the Ocean Biogeographic Information System. HMSC's education branch offers academic and public education programs for schoolchildren, undergraduate students and school teachers. The research branch works with governmental agencies and private industry, while its biodiversity unit, the Atlantic Reference Centre, has the largest collections of Atlantic organisms in Canada. The HMSC hosts the executive office of the Ocean Biogeographic Information System. The Huntsman Aquarium and Museum includes a teeming touch tank. Live marine specimens, displays, and marine ecology films are available from May to October.

References

Educational institutions established in 1969
Biological research institutes
Organizations based in New Brunswick
Aquaria in Canada
1969 establishments in New Brunswick